KXOI (810 AM) is a radio station licensed to Crane, Texas.  The station airs a Spanish language religious radio format and is owned by Hispanic Family Christian Network, Inc.

References

External links

XOI
XOI
XOI
Crane County, Texas